Rowland Tappan Berthoff (September 20, 1921 – March 25, 2001) was an American historian, working in the fields of immigration and social life in the USA. He is best known for his 1971 book An Unsettled People: Order and Disorder in American Life.

He was born in Toledo, Ohio, attended Oberlin College, did graduate work at Harvard University where he received a doctorate in 1952, as a student of Oscar Handlin. Berthoff was an Assistant Professor of History at Princeton University from 1953, and then a professor of history at Washington University in St. Louis, from 1962. He was made chairman of Washington University's history department and named William Elliott Smith Professor of History in 1971.

He promoted social history and ethnic history. His 1960 article on "The American Social Order: A Conservative Hypothesis," called for a conservative interpretation of American history.

References

Further reading
 Berthoff, Rowland. "The American Social Order: A Conservative Hypothesis," American Historical Review, April 1960, Vol. 65 Issue 3, pp 495–514 in JSTOR

1921 births
2001 deaths
20th-century American historians
American male non-fiction writers
Oberlin College alumni
Harvard University alumni
Princeton University faculty
Washington University in St. Louis faculty
20th-century American male writers